The Ted Knight Show may refer to:

The Ted Knight Show (1978 TV series), an American situation comedy that aired in 1978
Too Close for Comfort, an American situation comedy that was retitled The Ted Knight Show during its final season in 1986